The  Little League World Series took place between August 21 and August 25 in Williamsport, Pennsylvania. The Puzih Little League of Taipei, Taiwan, defeated the Campbell Little League of Campbell, California, in the championship game of the 33rd Little League World Series.

Teams

Championship Bracket

Position Bracket

External links
1979 Little League World Series
Line scores for the 1979 LLWS

Little League World Series
Little League World Series
Little League World Series